Alsomyia is a genus of flies in the family Tachinidae.

Species
Alsomyia capillata Rondani, 1859
Alsomyia keili Ziegler, 1995
Alsomyia olfaciens (Pandellé, 1896)
Alsomyia splendens Richter, 1994

Alsomyia chloronitens Mesnil, 1977 was moved to Nealsomyia.

References

Exoristinae
Tachinidae genera
Diptera of Europe
Diptera of Asia
Taxa named by Friedrich Moritz Brauer
Taxa named by Julius von Bergenstamm